Sar Poleh-ye Baba Hoseyn (also Romanized as Sar Poleh-ye Babā Ḩoseyn) is a village in Koregah-e Sharqi Rural District, in the Central District of Khorramabad County, Lorestan Province, Iran. At the 2006 census, its population was 43, in 8 families.

References 

Towns and villages in Khorramabad County